Diggers of the Anzac is an extended play (EP) by Australian country music artist John Williamson, it is an consisting of six previously released material. It was released in April 2015 and peaked at number 100 on the ARIA Charts. 

On 22 April 2016, the EP was re-released under the title Looking for a Story, which included the new track "Looking for a Story". The EP peaked at number 32 on the ARIA Charts. Williamson performed "Looking for a Story" live on Sunrise on 25 April 2016.

Track listing

Charts

Weekly charts

Year-end charts

Release history

References

2016 EPs
EPs by Australian artists
John Williamson (singer) albums